The 2008 Marion Mayhem season was the third season for the Continental Indoor Football League (CIFL) franchise. Finishing with a 7-5 record in 2008, the Mayhem were eliminated from the 2008 CIFL playoffs.  The Mayhem players had already turned in their equipment for the year when it was announced that the defending CIFL champion Rochester Raiders (12-0) had been suspended by the league and had to forfeit their playoff spot.  The Mayhem were invited to replace the former champs in the CIFL Atlantic Conference Western Division playoffs where they would face their conference foe Saginaw.  The Mayhem gathered their players back together and headed to Saginaw to face the Sting.  The playoff game went down to the wire where a goal-line stand by the Saginaw defense with only seconds left on the clock ended the Mayhem's season. The final score Sting 41 - Mayhem 34.

Schedule

2008 standings

References

2008 Continental Indoor Football League season
Marion Mayhem
Marion Mayhem